Erica plukenetii is a species of flowering plant native to the Cape region of South Africa. It belongs to the genus Erica. The species is morphologically variable, and five subspecies are recognised. The larger, variably coloured, flowers of E. plukenetii ssp. plukenetii (similar to those of E. plukenetii ssp. bredensis, E. plukenetii ssp. lineata, and E. plukenetii ssp. penicellata) are pollinated by sunbirds, whilst the smaller, exclusively white, flowers of E. plukenetii ssp. breviflora are moth pollinated.

Gallery

References

plukenetii
Flora of the Cape Provinces
Taxa named by Carl Linnaeus